The Australian V Festival was an Australian music festival, and a spin-off of the British V Festival. Like all V Festivals, the event was primarily sponsored by Virgin Mobile. In Australia the event was also sponsored by airline Virgin Blue. The V Festival was televised exclusively in Australia by MTV, and from 2008, also by its sister channel VH1. In 2008 the festival expanded to four shows, with Melbourne and Perth being added. Since the 2009 V Festival the event has been in hiatus, with the official website stating "V Festival Australia is taking a break at the moment".

Artist lineups

Artist lineup 2009

The festival's first announcement was made on 18 November 2008, with the second announcement occurring on 11 February 2009.

Artist lineup 2008

The festival's first announcement was made on 28 November 2007.
The festival's second announcement was made on 10 February 2008. It included the return of the Virgin Mobile Venue, the festival's fourth stage, which featured local and international DJs.

 *Mika was originally featured in the first announcement, but cancelled due to recording commitments.

Artist lineup 2007

The festival ran two shows in its inaugural year: one at Centennial Park in Sydney on 31 March and one at Avica Resort on the Gold Coast on 1 April.

Sideshows and others

Best of V Festival (Mini V) 2007
The promoter of the festival, Michael Coppel, declared Melbourne a "festival graveyard", and did not book a venue for the festival in the city, despite the fact that several very successful Big Day Out festivals had been held in Melbourne since 1993. Adelaide also missed out on the festival, disappointing many Victorian and South Australian fans who were hoping to see Pixies on their first Australian tour.

To make up for the omission, a "Best of V Festival" series of concerts was organised, also called "Mini V", in which the Pet Shop Boys, Groove Armada, Gnarls Barkley and The Rapture played in Melbourne (at the Sidney Myer Music Bowl) on 3 April, while Pixies, Jarvis Cocker, Phoenix and New York Dolls played in Adelaide (at the Thebarton Theatre) on the same night. The following night (4 April) the line-ups swapped cities with Pet Shop Boys playing in Adelaide and Pixies playing in Melbourne.

The move was controversial, however, with tickets for one night at the Melbourne show costing only slightly less ($110 in Melbourne, $99 in Adelaide) than a festival ticket ($124), and double that to attend both nights. The promoter responded that the similar cost was to do with the economics of scale regarding the smaller capacity venues in Melbourne and Adelaide.

V Festival Sideshows 2008

The Best Of shows did not return in 2008, for several reasons. Firstly, Melbourne was given a full V Festival for 2008, due to the availability of the newly renovated Showgrounds. Secondly, Adelaide, after again missing out on a full-scale festival, received, along with other capital cities in Australia and New Zealand, a variety of sideshows from V Festival artists, intended to replace the Best Of shows.

The sideshow schedule was as follows:

See also
V Festival (UK)
Virgin Festival (North America)

References

External links

V Festival 2007 on Virgin Mobile
Official Virgin Group site

Rock festivals in Australia